Tommy McIntyre (born 26 December 1963) is a Scottish professional football coach and a former player, who played for Aberdeen, Hibernian and Airdrieonians in the 1980s and 1990s. He was most recently the manager of the B squad of Celtic.

McIntyre began his career at Aberdeen but left them to join Hibernian in 1986. He soon became an important part of Alex Miller's side, winning the Scottish League Cup in 1991 and made over 100 league appearances for the club. He scored the opening goal in the 1991 Scottish League Cup Final with a penalty kick.

After retiring as a player, McIntyre was employed by the Scottish Football Association as their head of youth development and assistant technical director. He left the latter position on 1 July 2009 to become the new head of Celtic's Professional Academy.

References

External links

1963 births
Aberdeen F.C. players
Airdrieonians F.C. (1878) players
Celtic F.C. non-playing staff
Association football defenders
Hibernian F.C. players
Living people
Scottish Football League players
Scottish footballers
Footballers from Bellshill
Scottish football managers
Association football coaches
Lowland Football League managers